Kamberk is a municipality and village in Benešov District in the Central Bohemian Region of the Czech Republic. It has about 100 inhabitants.

Administrative parts
Villages of Hrajovice and Předbořice are administrative parts of Kamberk.

Gallery

References

Villages in Benešov District